The Drawing Center is a museum and a nonprofit exhibition space in Manhattan, New York City, that focuses on the exhibition of drawings, both historical and contemporary.

History 
The Drawing Center was founded by former assistant curator of drawings at the Museum of Modern Art Martha Beck in 1977, with the mandate of seeking to "express the quality and diversity of drawing -- unique works on paper -- as a major art form". It was originally housed in $900-a-month ground-floor space in a warehouse at 137 Greene Street in SoHo before it moved to its present location, on the ground floor of a 19th-century cast-iron-fronted building at 35 Wooster Street, in the late 1980s. In its first year, the Drawing Center attracted 125,000 visitors.

After a $10 million renovation in 2012, designed by Claire Weisz of WXY Architecture & Urban Design, the museum today occupies two and a half floors, 50 percent more exhibition space.

Activities 
Each year, the center presents "Selections" exhibitions featuring the work of emerging artists as well as exhibitions of historical and contemporary drawing-based work. In conjunction with its interior expansion in 2012, the Drawing Center announced the start of a long-term initiative to exhibit Latin American drawing. The Drawing Room, located across the street from the Main Gallery, features dynamic, drawing-based installations and exhibitions by emerging and under-recognized artists.  The center offers a range of public programs for both adults and children, including film screenings, literary readings, artist talks, symposia, performances, and The Big Draw, a day-long event or series of events featuring artist-led drawing activities for all ages.

List of shows

Before 2010 
 Leon Golub: Live & Die Like a Lion?
 Selections Spring 2010: Sea Marks
 Sun Xun: Shock of Time
 Apparently Invisible: Selections Spring 2009
 Matt Mullican: A Drawing Translates the Way of Thinking
 M/M (Paris): Just Like an Ant Walking on the Edge of the Visible
 Greta Magnusson Grossman: Furniture and Lighting
 Rirkrit Tiravanija: Demonstration Drawings
 Kathleen Henderson: What If I Could Draw a Bird That Could Change the World?
 Drawing on Film
 Frederick Kiesler: Co-Realities
 Yüksel Arslan: Visual Interpretations
 Drawing Out: Student Artwork from Drawing Connections
 Selections Spring 2008
 Sterling Ruby: CHRON
 Alan Saret Gang Drawings, 2007

2010 
 "Day Job" group show: artists: Chris Akin, Pasquale Cortese, Elizabeth Duffy, Caroline Falby, Alex Gingrow, Tom Hooper, Alexa Horochowski, Michael Krueger, Shawn Kuruneru, Travis LeRoy Southworth, Mary Lydecker, Raul J. Mendez (PNCA ’97), Julia Oldham, Alex O’Neal, Roberto Osti, Zach Rockhill, Luis Romero, Alfred Steiner, Justin Storms, Harvey Tulcensky, Jonathan Wahl.
 Gerhard Richter, Lines which do not exist
 Claudia Wieserm, Poems of the Right Angle
 Dorothea Tanning: Early Designs for the Stage
 Eva Hesse Drawing
 Leon Golub: Live & Die Like a Lion?
 Drawing Out: Student Artwork from the Drawing Connections Program
 Iannis Xenakis: Composer, Architect, Visionary
 Ree Morton: At the Still Point of the Turning World
 Unica Zürn: Dark Spring

2011 
 Pathways Drawing In, On, and Through the Landscapegroup show:artists: Ann Carlson i Mary Ellen Strom, Mark Harris, Jessica Mein, Terry Nauheim, Candida Richardson, Gosia Wlodarczak
 Drawing and its Double, Selections from the Istituto Nazionale per la Grafica, group show:artists: Giorgio Ghisi, Lafrery Du Perac, Salvator Rosa, Giovanni Battista Piranesi, Antonio Canova, Giorgio Morandi, Piero Dorazio, Achille Perilli
 Paolo Canevari, Decalogo
 Drawn from Photography group show:artists: L Alvarez, Andrea Bowers, Fernando Bryce, Sam Durant, Ewan Gibbs, Karl Haendel, Richard Forster, Serkan Ozkaya, Emily Prince, Frank Selby, Paul Sietsema, Mary Temple, Christian Tomaszewski (C.T. Jasper)

2012 
 Guillermo Kuitca, Diarios
 José Antonio Suárez Londoño The Yearbooks
 Sean Scully, Change and Horizontals

2013 
 Drawing Time, Reading Time- group show: artists: Carl Andre, Pavel Büchler, Guy de Cointet, Mirtha Dermisache, Sean Landers, Allen Ruppersberg, Nina Papaconstantinou, Deb Sokolow, Molly Springfield.
 William Engelen, Falten
 Susan Hefuna and Luca Veggetti, NOTATIONOTATIONS
 Terry Smith, Document
 Giosetta Fioroni L’Argento
 Alexandre Singh, The Pledge
 Ignacio Uriarte, Line of Work
 Ishmael Randall, Weeks, Cuts, Burns, Punctures

2014 
 Sari Dienes, Sari Dienes 
 Xanti Schawinsky, Head Drawings and Faces of War
 Thread Lines group show:artists:   Mónica Bengoa, Louise Bourgeois, Sheila Hicks, Ellen Lesperance, Kimsooja, Beryl Korot, Maria Lai, Sam Moyer, William J. O'Brien, Robert Otto Epstein, Jessica Rankin, Elaine Reichek, Drew Shiflett, Alan Shields, Lenore Tawney and Anne Wilson 
 The Intuitionists group show:artists:  : Shaun Acton, Valerio Berruti, A.J. Bocchino, Dana Boussard, Hannah Burr, Maria Bussman, Enrique Chagoya, Joyce Chan, Catalina Chervin, Hannah Cole, Kenny Cole, Vincent Colvin, Hollis Cooper, Cui Fei, Gabriel Delgado, Wendy DesChene, Asya Dodina i Slava Polishchuk, Debra Drexler, Derek Dunlop, Elisabeth Eberle, Lisa Endriss, Rodney Ewing, Tory Fair, Douglas Florian, Nicholas Fraser, Carl Fudge, Brett Goodroad, Barry Gray, Stephen Grossman, Nathan Haenlein, Patrick Earl Hammie, Skowmon Hastanan, HENSE, Elizabeth Hoak-Doering, Cynthia Ona Innis, Tatiana Istomina, Hedwige Jacobs, Chiaki Kamikawa, Manfred Kirschner, Kimia Kline, Nicholas Knight, Kang Joo Lee, Kate Tessa Lee, Cynthia Lin, Hung Liu, Maess, Mario Marzan, Linn Meyers, Nyeema Morgan, Paul Morrison, Seamus Liam O'Brien, Alison Owen, Jenny Perlin, Mel Prest, Jo Ann Rothschild, Anna Schachte, Fausto Sevila, Jill Shoffiet, Thomas Slaughter, Chris Spinelli, Karen Tam, Caroline Tavelli-Abar, Scott Teplin, Jen Urso, Kris Van Dessel, Kara Walker and Margaret Withers.
 Small, group show: artists: Firelei Báez, Emmanouil Bitsakis, Paul Chiappe, Claire Harvey, Tom Molloy, Rita Ponce de León, Peggy Preheim, James Sheehan and Tinus Vermeersch 
 Lebbeus Woods, Architect
 Len Lye, Motion Sketch
 Open Sessions, group show: artists:  Eleanor Aldrich, Derek Dunlop, Heather Hart, Yara Pina, Andrew Ross, Lauren Seiden, Barbara Weissberger. 
 Andrea Bowers i Suzanne LacyDrawing Lessons
 Rashaad Newsome, FIVE 
 Deborah Grant, Christ You Know it Ain't Easy!!
 Dickinson/Walser Pencil Sketches

Management and funding
The Drawing Center named Laura Hoptman, a former curator at The Museum of Modern Art, Executive Director in 2018.

In August 2005, the Drawing Center was considered one of the groups to occupy the World Trade Center. The plan was scrapped, and then the center's leadership spent a couple of years exploring a move to the South Street Seaport, where it planned to build a $60 million museum. By 2010 the museum decided to stay put and expand its Wooster Street home.

Also in 2005, it was among 406 New York City arts and social service institutions to receive part of a $20 million grant from the Carnegie Corporation, which was made possible through a donation by New York City mayor Michael Bloomberg. For the 2012 renovation, the Lower Manhattan Development Corporation gave a $3 million grant, one of its largest contributions toward a single construction project.

As of 2011, attendance was at 35,000 visitors a year. As of 2018, the center attracted 55,000 visitors a year.

References

External links

Drawing
Art museums established in 1977
Art museums and galleries in New York City
Museums in Manhattan
1977 establishments in New York City
SoHo, Manhattan
Arts centers in New York City